Quex-Ul is a supervillain appearing in American comic books published by DC Comics. He is depicted as an enemy of Superman.

Quex-Ul appeared in the television series Krypton, portrayed by Gordon Alexander.

Publication history
Quex-Ul first appeared in Superman #157 (1962) and was created by Curt Swan and Edmond Hamilton.

Fictional character biography

Pre-Crisis
First appearing in Superman #157 (Nov. 1962), Quex-Ul was a Kryptonian exiled to the Phantom Zone when he was convicted of killing Rondors, an endangered species, to use their healing horns for the purpose of profit. He confessed and spent his time in the Zone, but was released by Superman when his time was up. Not a grateful sort, he attempted to lure Superman into a gold kryptonite trap, until Superman discovered that Quex-Ul had actually been controlled by another Kryptonian, Rog-Ar, the true rondor killer. Learning this, Quex-Ul threw himself into the trap to save the hero, losing his powers and memory.

In the 1982 The Phantom Zone mini-series, he later works at the Daily Planet, believing himself to be an Earthman named "Charlie Kweskill". Susceptible to unconscious influence by Phantom Zoners, he unwittingly frees them and is himself trapped in the Zone along with Superman. Together they seek a way out of the Zone, ultimately facing a malevolent entity called Aethyr, whose mind creates the Phantom Zone. On arrival, Superman and Quex-Ul find themselves wearing each other's clothes, and "Charlie" wonders if he now has super powers. It is unclear whether his powers or memory have actually been restored, the costume swap having been effected as some sort of amusement by Aethyr. To save the Man of Steel, Quex-Ul flies towards Aethyr and dies in a shower of fiery breath, sacrificing his life in a final act of redemption.

Post-Crisis

In the Pocket Universe (an alternate version of the pre-Crisis Earth-One), Quex-Ul was freed with General Zod and Zaora from the Phantom Zone by a naive Lex Luthor, whereupon they turned Pocket Earth into a dead world. Quex-Ul and the others were executed by Superman using Kryptonite, a controversial move that haunted him for some time.

Adventure Comics
In Adventure Comics #512 (late May 2010), Quex-Ul makes an appearance under the cover name of Edward Robertson. He was later killed by Squad K of Project 7734. He is also shown in the Phantom Zone with General Zod and the rest of the Phantom Zone criminals, including Jax-Ur, Non, Ursa, Car-Vex, Az-Rel and Nadira. His was a plan developed by Car-Vex aka Officer Romundi and General Sam Lane.

Powers and abilities
As a Kryptonian, Quex-Ul has superpowers derived from under the light of Earth's yellow sun in that solar system. His basic abilities are sufficient for him to bend steel, overpower a locomotive, leap over a tall building in one bound, and outrun a speeding bullet, as well as virtual invulnerability, accelerated recovery, laser eyebeams, vortex breath, and flight. He possesses extraordinary senses of hearing and sight, including x-ray, telescopic, and microscopic vision. Like all Kryptonians, he is vulnerable to Kryptonite, red sunlight, and magic.

In other media

Television
 Quex-Ul appears in the Justice League Action episode "Field Trip", voiced by Jason J. Lewis. This version was imprisoned in the Phantom Zone alongside General Zod and Faora.
 Quex-Ul appears in the Krypton episode "House of El", portrayed by Gordon Alexander. This version is a member of the eponymous planet's military guild and commander of the Sagitari squadron before he is mercilessly killed by one of his soldiers, Lyta-Zod, for his position.

Miscellaneous
Quex-Ul appears in several 'Choose Your Own Adventure'-type novels, as a prominent prisoner of the Phantom Zone who was reputed to be powerful without a yellow sun's rays, but not exceptionally intelligent, relying on General Zod for orders.

References

DC Comics characters who can move at superhuman speeds
DC Comics characters with accelerated healing
DC Comics characters with superhuman senses
DC Comics characters with superhuman strength
DC Comics extraterrestrial supervillains
DC Comics supervillains
Fictional characters with absorption or parasitic abilities
Fictional characters with air or wind abilities
Fictional characters with energy-manipulation abilities
Fictional characters with fire or heat abilities
Fictional characters with ice or cold abilities
Fictional characters with nuclear or radiation abilities
Fictional characters with slowed ageing
Fictional characters with superhuman durability or invulnerability
Fictional characters with X-ray vision
Fictional serial killers
Kryptonians
Comics characters introduced in 1962
Superman characters
Characters created by Curt Swan